N. crocea may refer to:

 Neohesperilla crocea, an Oceanian butterfly
 Nephrotoma crocea, a crane fly
 Nereis crocea, a polychaete worm
 Noumea crocea, a sea slug